Z-Man may refer to:
 Z-Man (rapper), rapper from the San Francisco Bay Area
 Z-Man Games, a company based in New York
 Z-Man Records, an Australian record label
 Tom Zenk (1958–2017), American professional wrestler
 Fishing gear company

See  also:
 Zman (disambiguation)
 Z. Mann Zilla, American rapper and artist